Stadionul Orășenesc is a multi-purpose stadium in Filiași, Romania. It is currently used mostly for football matches, is the home ground of CSO Filiași and Luceafărul Filiași. The stadium was opened in 2019 and has a capacity of 1,360 seats.

References

External links
Stadionul Orășenesc (Filiași) at soccerway.com

Football venues in Romania
Sport in Dolj County
Buildings and structures in Dolj County